Potamiaena genus of seed bugs in the tribe Drymini (family Rhyparochromidae), erected by William Lucas Distant in 1910. There is a single species: Potamiaena aurifera, found in India and Southeast Asia.

References

External links

 

Taxa named by William Lucas Distant
Insects described in 1910
Fauna of India